Lars Ericsson (born 16 April 1956) is a Swedish former motorcycle speedway rider who rode for Indianarna in the Swedish First Division and Leicester Lions in the British League.

Born in Torsby, Ericsson rode in the Swedish Third Division in 1976 for Solkatterna, moving up to the Swedish top flight in 1977 with Indianarna. He competed in the 1977 Individual Speedway Junior European Championship, finishing seventh. In 1978, he was signed by Leicester Lions, but he failed to score consistently and was released after riding in seven matches.

References

1956 births
Living people
Swedish speedway riders
Leicester Lions riders